AIK Fotboll, more commonly known simply as AIK, an abbreviation for Allmänna Idrottsklubben (meaning the public or general sports club), is a Swedish football club competing in Allsvenskan, the top flight of Swedish football. The club was founded 1891 in Stockholm and the football department was formed in 1896. AIK's home ground is Friends Arena, located in Solna, just outside of Stockholm.

League champions in 2018, AIK has 12 championship titles and is third in the all-time Allsvenskan table. The club holds the record for having played the most seasons in the Swedish top flight.

In Europe, AIK reached the quarter-finals of the 1996–97 UEFA Cup Winners' Cup, qualified for the 1999–00 UEFA Champions League group stage, and competed in the 2012–13 UEFA Europa League group stage.

History

Kit
The first shirt is black and the second shirt is white. Shorts are white or, on rare occasions, black. Socks are striped in black and yellow; second socks are all white. A yellow third jersey was used in 2004, an orange third jersey was used in 2007, a dark-blue third jersey was used in 2010 and a grey commemorative third jersey was used in 2016. A dark-blue first shirt was used for the 2017–2018 UEFA Europa League qualification campaign.

When Adidas was the kit provider, new kits were launched every even year. Nike, however, releases a new AIK kit every year, before the start of the new season.

Apart from the brand of their kit provider Nike, AIK has the logos of the following sponsors visible on their shirt and shorts: Truecaller a caller-ID app; Svea, a financial group; German automakers Volkswagen; Stadium, a sports retailer, and league sponsors Svenska Spel, a government-owned gambling company (whose logo is mandatory on the right sleeve of the shirts of all Allsvenskan teams).

Stadium

Since the 2013 season, AIK play their home games at the Nationalarenan (known for sponsorship reasons as Friends Arena until 2023), which also houses the Swedish national football team. The decision which arena would replace Råsunda, the club's home up until the 2012 season, was made by a vote of the club's members, held in 2011, which resulted in a large majority favoring Nationalarenan over Tele2 Arena.

Support

Rivalries
AIK's main rival is Djurgården, also formed in 1891 in Stockholm, just three weeks after AIK. Widely considered the fiercest rivalry in Swedish – and arguably also Nordic – football, the fixture between the clubs is known as Tvillingderbyt (the Twin derby). AIK also maintains a strong animosity towards the third major Stockholm side Hammarby. The club's biggest rival outside the Stockholm urban area is IFK Göteborg, followed by Malmö FF.

Attendances
In 2006 AIK had an average attendance of over 21,000, the highest in Sweden In 2007 AIK had an average attendance of over 20,000. AIK have had the highest average attendance 41 times, more than any other club in Sweden. AIK finished the 2013 season with an average attendance of 18,900, the highest number in Scandinavia. That was also the first season with the new arena. In 2018, AIK broke the record for most sold tickets in an Allsvenskan game in the derby against Hammarby two weeks before the game was played.

Club culture
The club's entrance music and hymn is "Å vi e AIK" (meaning "Oh we are AIK"), a Swedish-lyric version (written in the 1980s) of a 1971 song, "The Last Farewell", originally performed by its co-writer, the British-Kenyan folk singer Roger Whittaker. The recording that has been used as AIK's entrance music since the mid 00s was released in 2002, an arrangement somewhat closer to Elvis Presley's 1976 cover of the song.

Players

First-team squad

Retired numbers
1 – Fans of the club

Out on loan

Notable past players

Non-playing personnel

Backroom staff

Coaching staff

Medical staff

Other

Coaching history

 Fred Spiksley (1911)
 Ferdinand Humenberger (1930–32)
 Jimmy Elliott (1932–34)
 Per Kaufeldt (1934–40)
 Václav Simon (1940–44)
 Istvan Wampetits (1944–48)
 George Raynor (1 July 1948 – 30 June 1952)
 Per Kaufeldt (1951–56)
 Henry Carlsson (1956–58)
 Frank Soo (1958)
 Erik "Lillis" Persson (1959)
 Lajos Szendrödi (1960–61)
 Hilding "Moggli" Gustafsson (1962–64)
 Henry Carlsson (1965–66)
 Ingemar Ingevik (1967–68)
 Torsten Lindberg (1 Jan 1969 – 31 Dec 1970)
 Jens Lindblom (1971–74)
 Keith Spurgeon (1 Jan 1975 – 31 Dec 1975)
 Kurt Liander (1975)
 Lars-Oscar Nilsson (1976)
 Gunnar Nordahl (1977–78)
 Olavus Olsson (1978 – Dec 78)
 Jens Lindblom (1979)
 Bo Petersson (1979–80)
 Rolf Zetterlund (1 Jan 1981 – 31 Dec 1986)
 Göran Åberg (1987)
 Nisse Andersson (1 July 1987–87)
 Sanny Åslund (1988–90)
 Tommy Söderberg (1991–93)
 Hans Backe (1 Jan 1994 – 30 June 1995)
 Erik Hamrén (1 Jan 1995 – 31 Dec 1997)
 Stuart Baxter (1 Jan 1998 –  Dec 2000)
 Olle Nordin (2001–02)
 Peter Larsson (2002)
 Dušan Uhrin (1 July 2002 – 31 Oct 2002)
 Richard Money (1 Jan 2003 – 19 April 2004)
 Patrick Englund (2004)
 Rikard Norling (Jan 2005 – Nov 2008)
 Mikael Stahre (1 Jan 2009 – 24 April 2010)
 Björn Wesström (interim) (26 April 2010 – 22 June 2010)
 Alex Miller (22 June 2010 – 10 Nov 2010)
 Andreas Alm (1 Jan 2011 – 13 May 2016)
 Rikard Norling (13 May 2016 – 27 July 2020)
 Bartosz Grzelak (31 July 2020 – 19 August 2022)
 Henok Goitom (interim) (19 August 2022 – 8 November 2022)
 Andreas Brännström (8 November 2022 – Present)

Honours
 Swedish Champions
 Winners (12): 1900, 1901, 1911, 1914, 1916, 1923, 1931–32, 1936–37, 1992, 1998, 2009, 2018

League
 Allsvenskan:
 Champions (6): 1931–32, 1936–37, 1983, 1998, 2009, 2018
 Runners-up (15): 1930–31, 1934–35, 1935–36, 1938–39, 1946–47, 1972, 1974, 1984, 1999, 2006, 2011, 2013, 2016, 2017, 2021
 Superettan:
 Winners: 2005
 Mästerskapsserien:
 Winners: 1992
 Svenska Serien:
 Runners-up (5): 1910, 1914–15, 1915–16, 1922–23, 1923–24

Cups
 Svenska Cupen
 Winners (8): 1949, 1950, 1975–76, 1984–1985, 1995–96, 1996–97, 1998–99, 2009
 Runners-up (8): 1943, 1947, 1968–69, 1991, 1994–95, 1999–2000, 2000–01, 2002
 Svenska Mästerskapet
 Winners (6): 1900, 1901, 1911, 1914, 1916, 1923
 Runners-up: 1898, 1917
 Allsvenskan play-offs
 Runners-up: 1986
 Svenska Supercupen
 Winners: 2010
 Runners-up: 2012
 Corinthian Bowl
 Runners-up: 1912, 1913
 Rosenska Pokalen
 Runners-up: 1899, 1900
 Wicanderska Välgörenhetsskölden
 Winners: 1908, 1909, 1914, 1916
 Runners-up: 1905, 1906, 1915

Invitational
 Tournoi de Pentecôte de Paris:
 Winners (1): 1921
 Singapore Community Shield:
 Winners (1): 2010

AIK in Europe

European games

UEFA Team rank
The following list ranks the current position of AIK in UEFA ranking:

As of 16 January 2023.

Footnotes

References

External links

Official
 AIK Fotboll

Major fan websites
 AIKforum – fan community
 Gnagarforum – fan community
 Allmänna Supporterklubben
 Black Army
 Sol Invictus
 Ultras Nord
 Smokinglirarna
 AIK-Tifo – terrace choreographers

 
Allsvenskan clubs
Association football clubs established in 1891
Football clubs in Stockholm
Sport in Stockholm
Football clubs in Stockholm County
1891 establishments in Sweden
Svenska Cupen winners